Muhammad Shahabuddin (Urdu: محمد شہاب الدین) was the 3rd Chief Justice of Pakistan, serving from 3 May 1960, to 12 May 1960. He also served as the Governor of East Pakistan.

Early life 
Muhammad Shahabuddin was born on 13 May 1895 at Ellore in Madras.  He graduated in arts from Madras Christian College and in law from Madras Law College.

Career 
He joined the Indian Civil Service in November 1921 and was posted as a sub-collector at Madras. He later served as a joint magistrate and a district and session judge until February 1943 when he was appointed an additional judge of the Madras High Court. In September 1945 he was confirmed as a judge of the Madras High Court.

Justice Shahabuddin was appointed as a judge of Dhaka High Court after the Partition. He served on the Indo-Pak Boundary Disputes Tribunal in 1949–50. He became the Chief Justice of the Dhaka High Court in February 1950. In 1953 he was appointed as a judge of the Federal Court. From 22 December 1954 to 14 June 1955 he acted as the Governor of East Bengal (Pakistan). Prime Minister Mohammad Ali Chaudhury handed over the government of East Pakistan to Abu Hossain Sarkar and made him chief Minister on 3 June 1955. Shahabuddin was not told of the decision beforehand and as a result he resigned from the governorship on 4 June 1955. He became the Chief Justice of Pakistan in 1955. Justice Shahabuddin also chaired the Constitution Commission.

Death 
He died on 12 May 1960 in Lahore, Pakistan.

See also
 List of Pakistanis
 Chief Justice of Pakistan

References

|-

Chief justices of Pakistan
Muhajir people
Pakistani judges
1895 births
Year of death missing
University of Madras alumni
Governors of East Pakistan